Soldatova is a feminine Russian surname. Notable people with the surname include:

 Aleksandra Soldatova (born 1998), Russian rhythmic gymnast
 Irina Soldatova (born 1965), Russian archer
 Julia Soldatova (born 1981), Russian figure skater

Russian-language surnames